Guillaume Garot (born 29 May 1966) is a French politician of the Socialist Party (PS) who has served as a member of the National Assembly from 2007 until 2012 and since 2014, representing the Mayenne department. From 2012 until 2014, he was Junior Minister for the Food Industry under minister Stéphane Le Foll in the government of Prime Minister Jean-Marc Ayrault.

Political career
Garot became a member of the National Assembly in the 2007 French legislative election. During his first term in parliament, he served on the Committee on Economic Affairs (2007-2009) and the Defence Committee (2009-2012) before his appointment to the government. In addition to his activities in national politics, he was the mayor of Laval from 2008 until 2012.

At the Socialist Party's Reims Congress in 2008, Garot supported Ségolène Royal's candidacy as party leader; she eventually lost against Martine Aubry. From 2011, he also worked as spokesperson for Royal's campaign to become the party's candidate for the 2012 French presidential election.

While in government, Garot oversaw the French government's response to the 2013 horse meat scandal.

After leaving government in 2014, Garot was part of the Finance Committee (2014-2015) and the Committee on Legal Affairs (2014-2017). Since 2017, he has been serving on the Committee on Sustainable Development and Regional Planning. In 2015, he was the parliament's rapporteur on legislation obliging supermarkets to hand over unused food to charity and not destroy leftover products.

In addition to his committee assignments, Garot is part of the French-Japanese Parliamentary Friendship Group and the French-Tunisian Parliamentary Friendship Group.

Other activities
 National Council on Food (CNA), Chairman (2016-2019)

Political positions
In July 2019, Garot voted against the French ratification of the European Union’s Comprehensive Economic and Trade Agreement (CETA) with Canada.

References

External links 
 Le blog d'information de Guillaume Garot 

1966 births
Living people
People from Laval, Mayenne
Mayors of places in Pays de la Loire
Socialist Party (France) politicians
Pantheon-Sorbonne University alumni
Sciences Po alumni
Deputies of the 13th National Assembly of the French Fifth Republic
Deputies of the 14th National Assembly of the French Fifth Republic
Deputies of the 15th National Assembly of the French Fifth Republic
Deputies of the 16th National Assembly of the French Fifth Republic